Jan Králík (born 7 March 1987 in Ústí nad Labem) is a Czech footballer who currently plays for Ústí nad Labem.

External links

1987 births
Living people
Czech footballers
FK Viktoria Žižkov players
FK Ústí nad Labem players
Czech expatriate footballers
Expatriate footballers in Slovakia
Expatriate footballers in Ukraine
Slovak Super Liga players
MŠK Rimavská Sobota players
MFK Ružomberok players
ŠK Slovan Bratislava players
SpVgg Bayern Hof players
Czech expatriate sportspeople in Slovakia
FC Oleksandriya players
Czech expatriate sportspeople in Ukraine
Association football forwards
Sportspeople from Ústí nad Labem